Pelusios marani, also known as the Gabon mud turtle, is a species of turtle in the family Pelomedusidae. This species is endemic to Africa.

Etymology
The specific name, marani, is in honor of herpetologist Jérôme Maran.

Geographic range
Pelusios marani is found in Gabon and the Republic of the Congo.

References

Bibliography
Bour R (2000). "Une nouvelle espèce de Pelusios du Gabon (Reptilia, Chelonii, Pelomedusidae)". Manouria 3 (8): 1-32. (Pelusios marani, new species). (in French).

Pelusios
Fauna of Gabon
Reptiles of the Republic of the Congo
Reptiles described in 2000